Mostafa Mohamed Fathi Abdel Hamid Mohamed (born 12 May 1994) is an Egyptian professional footballer who plays as a winger for Pyramids on loan from Saudi Pro League club Al Taawoun and the Egypt national team.

Honours
Zamalek
Egyptian Premier League: 2014–15, 2021–22
Egypt Cup: 2012–13, 2013–14, 2014–15, 2015–16, 2018–19
Egyptian Super Cup: 2016, 2019–20
CAF Confederation Cup: 2018–19
CAF Super Cup: 2020
Saudi-Egyptian Super Cup: 2018

References

External links

1994 births
Living people
Egyptian footballers
Zamalek SC players
Al-Taawoun FC players
Smouha SC players
Pyramids FC players
Egyptian Premier League players
Saudi Professional League players
Egyptian expatriate footballers
Expatriate footballers in Saudi Arabia
Egyptian expatriate sportspeople in Saudi Arabia
People from Mansoura, Egypt
Association football wingers
People from Dakahlia Governorate
2015 Africa U-23 Cup of Nations players